Characato is one of the most traditional district of Arequipa Province, Arequipa Region, Peru.  It is most famous for its bull fights and the variety of their food.

Characato is also a common nickname for a person from the Arequipa Region in the rest of Peru.

See also
 Arequipa
 Peru

Districts of the Arequipa Province
Districts of the Arequipa Region